Gugler or Gügler refers to a 1375 force of mostly English and French knights.

Gugler may also refer to:

Eric Gugler (1889–1974), American Neoclassical architect
Joseph Heinrich Aloysius Gügler (1782–1827), Swiss theologian
Christian Gugler (born 1960), Swiss athlete

See also
Googler